Ye Wooing of Peggy is a 1917 British silent romantic comedy film directed by Bertram Phillips and starring Queenie Thomas, Jack Grey and Frank Petley.

Cast
 Queenie Thomas as Peggy
 Jack Grey as Noel
 Frank Petley as Sir John
 Edgar Lyons

References

External links

1917 films
1917 romantic comedy films
Films directed by Bertram Phillips
British silent short films
British romantic comedy films
British black-and-white films
1910s English-language films
1910s British films
Silent romantic comedy films